is a Japanese professional footballer who plays as a winger for A-League club Newcastle Jets. He spent the majority of his career with Yokohama F. Marinos.

International career
Saito was born in Kanagawa. In August 2007, he was elected Japan U17 national team for 2007 FIFA U-17 World Cup. He played two matches. In July 2012, he was selected for the Japan U23 national team squad for the 2012 Summer Olympics. He played four matches and Japan won the 4th place.

In July 2013, Saito was elected Japan national team for 2013 East Asian Cup. At this tournament, on 21 July, he debuted against China. He was also called-up for the 2014 FIFA World Cup, but he did not play. He played six games and scored one goal for Japan until 2016.

Career statistics

Club

International

Scores and results list Japan's goal tally first, score column indicates score after each Saitō goal.

Honours
Yokohama F. Marinos
Emperor's Cup: 2013

Kawasaki Frontale
J1 League: 2018, 2020
Japanese Super Cup: 2019

Nagoya Grampus
J.League Cup: 2021

Japan
AFC U-17 Championship: 2006
EAFF East Asian Cup: 2013

Individual
J. League Best Eleven : 2016

References

External links
 
 
 
 Profile at Nagoya Grampus 
 

1990 births
Living people
People from Kawasaki, Kanagawa
Association football people from Kanagawa Prefecture
Japanese footballers
Association football midfielders
Japan international footballers
Japan youth international footballers
Olympic footballers of Japan
Footballers at the 2012 Summer Olympics
2014 FIFA World Cup players
J1 League players
J2 League players
K League 1 players
Yokohama F. Marinos players
Ehime FC players
Kawasaki Frontale players
Nagoya Grampus players
Suwon Samsung Bluewings players
Newcastle Jets FC players
Japanese expatriate footballers
Expatriate footballers in South Korea
Japanese expatriate sportspeople in South Korea